Rivière-au-Tonnerre is a municipality in the Côte-Nord region of the province of Quebec in Canada.

In addition to Riviere-au-Tonnerre itself, the communities within the municipality include Rivière-Pigou, Rivière-aux-Graines, and Sheldrake, all located along the Gulf of Saint Lawrence and accessible via Quebec Route 138.

The main and almost exclusive local economic activity is crab fishing. A factory which processes the crab meat sustains the bulk of the population.

These falls with a total drop of about  have a roar that reminds one of the noise caused by thunder.
The Manitou River, not far west, also has dramatic falls near its mouth.

History

The first permanent settlers arrived circa 1853 or 1854, and founded Sheldrake and Riviere-au-Tonnerre as fishing settlements. In 1875, more pioneers followed, originating notably from Paspébiac in the Gaspésie region. At the same time, the first chapel was built and the Parish of Saint-Hippolyte was formed. However it was commonly called Rivière-au-Tonnerre, like the settlement. In 1890, the post office opened under the English equivalent name of "Thunder River" (Frenchized in 1933). By 1908, there were 70 families engaged in agriculture. In 1925, the Municipality of Riviere-au-Tonnerre was formed.

Demographics

Population

Language

Climate
Rivière-au-Tonnerre has a subarctic climate (Dfc) with mild summers, rainy autumns and long, cold and snowy winters with annual snowfall averaging 99 inches (251 cm). Winter typically starts in late October or early November and lasts through most of, if not all of April.

See also
 List of municipalities in Quebec

References

External links

 Official website

Municipalities in Quebec
Incorporated places in Côte-Nord